The 1985 Liège–Bastogne–Liège was the 71st edition of the Liège–Bastogne–Liège cycle race and was held on 21 April 1985. The race started and finished in Liège. The race was won by Moreno Argentin of the  team.

General classification

References

1985
1985 in Belgian sport
1985 Super Prestige Pernod International